The Sunbeam Matabele was a British 12-cylinder aero engine that was first flown in 1918. The Matabele was the last iteration of one of Sunbeam's most successful aero engines, the Cossack.

Design and development
The Cossack was a twin overhead camshaft V12, with four valves per cylinder. The Matabele fitted this with two of the blocks from the Saracen, using aluminium instead of the Cossack's cast iron. The Saracen's bore was slightly larger at 122 mm (from the Cossack's 110 mm) and with the same stroke of 160 mm this gave a capacity of 22.4 litres (1,370 cu in). Ignition was by four magnetos (two per bank), with twin sparkplugs. A propeller reduction gear of 1.63:1 was fitted.

Variants
Matabele II
A simplified engine was developed for non-aircraft use. This avoided the propeller reduction gearbox and had a single magneto per bank, rather than the duplicated magneto and sparkplug systems usual in aircraft for reliability. This engine was aimed at the developing market for racing powerboats.

Applications
The Matabele was tested successfully in a DH.4 from May 1918. The only order for the engine, however, came from France, where the engine was used to power the Nieuport-Delage NiD 30 airliner.

Sunbeam 1000 hp
The Matabele engine is best known today for having powered the Sunbeam 1000 hp land speed record car, the first car to exceed .

The S.T.D. Motors team was short of funds and so little new development was possible.

A pair of Matabele engines were found in the Sunbeam works at Wolverhampton, previously from a powerboat. The Sunbeam 1000HP has 4 magnetos per engine, these would appear to be Matabele I, rather than Matabele II.

On 29 March 1927, the Sunbeam became the first car to exceed .

The installation of these engines was somewhat unorthodox, necessitated by the limited funds for new work. The rear engine was started first by compressed air, then the front engine was started through a mechanical friction clutch. Once synchronised, they were locked together with a dog clutch for the record attempt. The car's last run was a demonstration circuit at Brooklands, running at slow speed on only one engine, with this dog clutch disconnected.

Specifications (Matabele)

See also

References

Notes

Bibliography

 
 Lumsden, Alec. British Piston Engines and their Aircraft. Marlborough, Wiltshire: Airlife Publishing, 2003. .

Matabele
1910s aircraft piston engines